The Hunt for Red October is a video game based on the 1990 film The Hunt for Red October. It was first released in 1991 for the Nintendo Entertainment System. Versions for the  Game Boy and  Super NES were subsequently released.

Gameplay

The game featured deep sea combat, side-scrolling action, and cinematic sequences. The object is to evade destruction and eliminate saboteurs. The caterpillar drive is particularly useful for quietly escaping the enemy.

The Super NES version is one of 11 games that uses the Super Scope accessory, though it is only used to play bonus stages that put the submarine in first person view, where the player has to destroy a number of enemies and projectiles. The use of the Super Scope is optional.

The NES version has an exclusive level: the final stage changes to platform-style gameplay. The player, as Ramius, must find and disable bombs Soviet-loyal crewmembers have set in the weapons bay of the Red October.

Reception

References

External links

1991 video games
Game Boy games
Nintendo Entertainment System games
Super Nintendo Entertainment System games
Submarine simulation video games
Light gun games
Cold War video games
Video games developed in Australia
Video games developed in the United States
Video games based on films
Video games based on The Hunt for Red October
Video games based on adaptations
Video games set in 1984